The 2004 Copa Libertadores de América (officially the 2004 Copa Toyota Libertadores de América for sponsorship reasons) was the 45th edition of the Copa Libertadores, CONMEBOL's premier annual international club tournament.

The tournament was won by Colombian club Once Caldas defeating defending champions Boca Juniors 2–0 on a penalty shoot-out. This was the second time, in the history of the tournament, that a team from Colombia won the Copa Libertadores. The first time was during Atlético Nacional's successful campaign.

This was the last Copa Libertadores in which the away goals rule would not be used in every two-legged knockout round. However, starting in the 2008 Copa Libertadores, the away goals rule was removed from the finals.

Group stage

Teams in green qualified directly to the Round of 16
Teams in yellow qualified to the playoff round

Group 1

Group 2

Group 3

Group 4

Group 5

Group 6

Group 7

Group 8

Group 9

Playoff round

Knockout stage

Bracket

Round of 16
First leg matches were played between May 4, 2004, and May 6, 2004. Second leg matches were played between May 11, 2004, and May 13, 2004.

|}

Quarterfinals
First leg matches were played on May 20, 2004, and May 21, 2004. Second leg matches were played between May 25, 2004, and May 27, 2004.

|}

Semifinals
First leg matches were played on June 9, 2004, and June 10, 2004. Second leg matches were played on June 16, 2004, and June 17, 2004.

|}

Finals

First leg match was played on June 23, 2004. Second leg match was played on July 2, 2004.

References

 http://www.colombia.com/futbol/copa_libertadores/2004/resultados/

External links
http://www.conmebol.com - Official Site of the CONMEBOL, who organized the Copa Libertadores. (In Spanish)

1
Copa Libertadores seasons